"Heartbeat" is a song performed by Latvian singer Justs. The song represented Latvia in the Eurovision Song Contest 2016, and was written by previous Latvian Eurovision entrant Aminata Savadogo. The song was released as a digital download on 3 February 2016 through Aminata Music.

Music video 
The video was directed by Andzej Gavriss who also directed Aminata Savadogo's video for "Love Injected".

Eurovision Song Contest 

On 31 January 2016, Sirmais was announced as one of the twenty competing acts in the second season of Supernova, with the song "Heartbeat". In the first heat on 7 February, Sirmais advanced to the semi-final after winning over 40% of the televote. He competed in the semi-final on 21 February and advanced to the final through televoting. He later won the final on 28 February with 20,725 votes. Justs represented Latvia in the Eurovision Song Contest 2016, performing in the first half of the second semi-final, and received enough points to perform at the finals. There, the song achieved 15th place out of 26 finalists.

Track listing

Charts

Release history

References

Eurovision songs of Latvia
Eurovision songs of 2016
2015 songs
2016 singles
Songs written by Aminata Savadogo